Al-Biruni was a medieval polymath.

Al-Biruni may also refer to:
Al-Beroni University in Afghanistan
Al-Biruni (crater), a lunar crater
9936 Al-Biruni, an asteroid
Biruni, the outer quarters in traditional Iranian architecture, as opposed to the andaruni